Ali Akbar Sadeghi (also Romanized as "Ali-Akbar Sādeqi"; born 22 November 1937) a graduate of the College of Art, University of Tehran, is one of the most prolific and successful Iranian painters and artists.

As a child, Ali Akbar Sadeghi reminisces that he would be lost in the chants of narrators that gave account of Shahnameh stories; accounts of Siavash riding on horseback, still-armored Bijan, Rostam’s arrow hitting Ashkbous in the heart, Faramarz, elephant rider, and bravery of other heroes whose names remain in Persian literature and Iranian folklore forever. In general, the lyrical, heroic world of legends is an indispensable part of Ali Akbar Sadeghi's worldview, a world whose figurative representations sometimes appear in old miniature paintings or more popular forms of art, including coffeehouse painting, reverse painting on glass, imprints on wood and paper, and stunning images in lithographed books.

He began to teach painting in high school in the 1950s, before entering the university in 1958. His early works were with watercolor, but as of 1959, soon after entering college, he began oil painting and drawing. He initiated a particular style in Persian painting, influenced by Coffee House painting, iconography, and traditional Iranian portrait painting, following the Qajar tradition – a mixture of a kind of surrealism, influenced by the art of stained glass. He did his early works in graphics and illustration. 

After the Iranian Revolution, Sadeghi seriously pursued painting. In 1989, he founded Sabz Gallery, which was actively and continuously exhibiting the works of Iranian painters until 2003.

Sadeghi has been artistically active in the past 60 years.

Work

In his paintings, Ali Akbar Sadeghi draws on the traditions of Persian art but adds to them a surreal edge.

Style

His style is a kind of Iranian surrealism, based on Iranian forms and compositions of traditional paintings, the use of Iranian iconography, and the use of Persian cultural motifs, signs and myths, full of movement and action, in prominent and genuine oil colours, in large frames, very personal, reminiscent of epic traditional Persian paintings and illustrations, with a conspicuous mythical style. He initiated a special style in Persian painting, influenced by Coffee House painting, iconography, and traditional Iranian portrait painting, following the Qajar tradition – a mixture of a kind of surrealism, influenced by the art of stained glass.

The spectacular style and flamboyant use of colour in paintings and sculptures of Ali Akbar Sadeghi behold the richness of iconography in Qajar Era paintings, particularly a school of painting that has become known as the Qahveh Khaneh (Coffee house paintings). The meticulous detailing, intricate scenes and the subject matter, often heroes in full armour, follow the traditions of Miniature painting. At close inspection a large number of artists’ works are in one way or another self-portraits. The story teller, the sleep walker, seems not to be able to invent without identifying with the characters of his imagination. Here is a marvellous world where the heroes of artist do not appear to be fighting the evils of the world, they are either frozen in time or seem to be engaged in their own internal conflict. From the “Hanged Coat” to the depiction of the old hero with an aid band on his face to the “Torture Armchair”, there is a strong sense of defeat but evil doesn't seem to have prevailed. It appears as if the artist is content with wisdom that age and years of turmoil has brought him. The Emotional power of these self-portraits and their poetic reality overwhelms the viewer and invokes feelings of sympathy that derives from conflict within every human being. The surreal world of Ali Akbar Sadeghi is governed by the strength of dreams, a world of his own. He successfully transfers his emotions and turmoil's but also creates scenes and objects that are complete and precise. A perfect balance. And when he is not busy pushing nails in to the faces of his heroes he is ready to play chess. The game of nobility that commands tact, maturity and dignity.

Filmography
Seven Cities (1971)
Flowers Storm (1972)
Boasting (1973)
The Rook (1974)
Malek Khorshid (1975)
Zaal and Simorgh (1977)
Coalition (2005)

See also 
History of animation
History of Iranian animation
Iranian art
Islamic art
Islamic calligraphy
List of Iranian artists

References

External links

Tavoos Magazine
Dideh Art Gallery
Tehran International Animation Festival
Aaran Gallery
TEDx Tehran on YouTube
Ali Akbar Sadeghi's Artworks in Artibition

1937 births
Living people
Iranian animators
Iranian animated film directors
Iranian illustrators
Iranian Science and Culture Hall of Fame recipients